Bill Horder was an Australian professional rugby league footballer who played in the 1940s and 1950s.  He played for Western Suburbs and Eastern Suburbs as a prop.

Playing career
Horder made his debut for Western Suburbs in 1948 and was a member of the Wests team which won the premiership that year defeating Balmain 8–5 in the grand final.  

In 1952, Horder was a member of the Wests team which won their fourth premiership defeating South Sydney 22–12 in the grand final.  This would be the last premiership Western Suburbs would win before exiting the competition in 1999 to merge with the Balmain Tigers.  

Horder played three more seasons with Wests before joining Easts in 1956 and played a single season with them before retiring.  Horder also represented New South Wales on 3 occasions in 1949.

References

1929 births
2004 deaths
Western Suburbs Magpies players
Sydney Roosters players
New South Wales rugby league team players
Australian rugby league players
Rugby league players from Sydney
Rugby league props